Amaru Facula is a bright, irregular depression on the surface of Mercury, located at 49.8° S, 349.5° W.  It was named by the IAU in 2018.  Amaru is the Quechua word for snake.

Amaru Facula is located northwest of Nākahi Facula.  The irregular depressions in both suggest they are probably volcanic vents. 

Both faculae are in the Debussy quadrangle and are roughly south of Debussy crater.

References

Surface features of Mercury